William Nicholas also listed as William Nichols/Nicholson, was an American baseball pitcher in the Negro leagues. He played with the Brooklyn/Newark Eagles in 1935 and 1936.

References

External links
 and Seamheads

Brooklyn Eagles players
Newark Eagles players
Year of birth unknown
Year of death unknown
Baseball pitchers